"All I Have to Offer You (Is Me)" is a song written by Dallas Frazier and A.L. "Doodle" Owens, and recorded by American country music artist Charley Pride. It was released in June 1969 as the first single from his compilation album The Best of Charley Pride.

The song, released that June, reached the top of the Billboard magazine Hot Country Singles chart that August, and in doing so it was Charley Pride's first No. 1 song. It also accomplished a feat not done in 25 years: an African American entertainer having a No. 1 hit on the Billboard country chart. The last song by a black performer to reach the summit was "Is You Is Or Is You Ain't My Baby" by Louis Jordan, in July 1944. Pride became the third black singer to have a No. 1 country hit (the Nat King Cole-led King Cole Trio had a No. 1 hit earlier in 1944).

While Cole would top the charts only once and Jordan twice, "All I Have to Offer You Is Me" would be the first of 29 No. 1 hits for Pride, spanning to 1983's "Night Games."

Content 
The narrator speaks to his future wife, and tells her that if she chose to be with him forever, then she won't live a luxurious life every girl dreams about, as he says "All I have to offer you is me".

Chart performance

Cover versions
The song has also been recorded by: 
Conway Twitty on his 1970 album To See My Angel Cry
The Statler Brothers on their 1970 album Bed of Rose's
McBride & the Ride on their 1992 album Sacred Ground
The Kaʻau Crater Boys on their 1995 album On Fire
Tammy Wynette and George Jones on their 1995 album One
Aaron Tippin on his 1998 album "The Essential Aaron Tippin" 
Ricky Van Shelton on his 2000 album Fried Green Tomatoes.

References

1969 singles
Charley Pride songs
The Statler Brothers songs
Conway Twitty songs
McBride & the Ride songs
Ricky Van Shelton songs
Songs written by Dallas Frazier
Songs written by A.L. "Doodle" Owens
Song recordings produced by Chet Atkins
Song recordings produced by Jack Clement
Song recordings produced by Bob Ferguson (musician)
Song recordings produced by Felton Jarvis
RCA Records singles
1969 songs